KRRW (105.9 FM; "North Star Country 105.9") is a radio station broadcasting a classic country format in New Ulm, Minnesota (licensed to Winthrop). The station serves the New Ulm area, as well as the Mankato metropolitan area with a fringe signal. KRRW is owned by Linder Radio Group.

History
KRRW signed on the air in 2008 as KHRS, simulcasting Mankato sister station KXLP (94.1 FM). KHRS brought KXLP's programming back to the New Ulm area, which the 94.1 signal did not reach; until 2007, the format and call sign was used on 93.1 FM in New Ulm (now KATO-FM). The KXLP simulcast ended in April 2020, when KHRS began to simulcast classic country with KEMJ (101.5 FM); the station took on 101.5's former KRRW call sign and branded as "North Star Country 105.9". KEMJ broke away from the simulcast in May 2020 and began stunting, ultimately changing to a hot adult contemporary format on May 18; the classic country format remained on 105.9.

References

External links

Radio stations in Minnesota
Radio stations established in 2008
2008 establishments in Minnesota
Classic country radio stations in the United States